The 2003 Wisconsin Badgers football team represented the University of Wisconsin–Madison during the 2003 NCAA Division I-A football season.  Led by Barry Alvarez, the Badgers completed the season with a 7–6 record, including a 4–4 mark in the Big Ten Conference, finishing in a tie for 7th in the Big Ten.

Schedule

Season summary
Wisconsin entered the 2003 season ranked, after an 8–6 campaign the year before. The Badgers defeated West Virginia and Akron to open the season, but then were shocked by perennially underachieving UNLV at home, 23–5. The stunning upset knocked the Badgers (then ranked 14th) out of the polls entirely, and they would not return until after wins in their first two Big Ten games, against Illinois and Penn State (teams that would combine for a 1–15 Big Ten record). With defending National Champion Ohio State coming to town on a 19-game winning streak, the Badgers put together a solid game, and ended the Buckeyes' winning streak in a 17–10 upset.

At 3–0 in the Big Ten and having defeated Ohio State, the Badgers were looking to put together a run at a Big Ten title. Unfortunately for the Badgers, Kyle Orton and the Purdue Boilermakers ended Wisconsin's undefeated Big Ten campaign with a 26–23 win in Camp Randall. The next week in Evanston, the 20th ranked Badgers lost 16–7 to Northwestern.

With Paul Bunyan's Axe on the line against Minnesota, the Badgers were unable to avoid giving up another late drive, and Minnesota beat the Badgers in Minneapolis for the 2nd time in a row, 37–34. Disheartened but not yet finished, the Badgers dealt a massive blow to Michigan State (which was riding a losing streak of its own) as they routed the Spartans, 56–21. It was their second straight win over MSU. WR Lee Evans caught 10 passes for 258 yards and 5 touchdowns in the game.

Against Iowa the next week, the Badgers took a 21–7 lead, which they proved unable to hold. Iowa defeated Wisconsin 27–21, a devastating loss on Senior Day that left the Badgers tied for 7th in the Big Ten. The Badgers accepted an invitation to the 2003 Music City Bowl against Auburn, a team ranked 6th in the nation in the preseason. The Badgers lost 28–14, closing out their 3rd season in a row with 6 or more losses.

FS Jim Leonhard caught 7 interceptions on defense for Wisconsin, leading the Badgers and the Big Ten. However, Wisconsin's defense gave up late scoring drives against Purdue, Minnesota, and Iowa, all games the Badgers lost.

Roster

West Virginia

Akron

UNLV

North Carolina

Illinois

Penn State

#3 Ohio State

#13 Purdue

Northwestern

Minnesota

#21 Michigan State

#17 Iowa

Auburn

Regular starters

Players selected in the 2004 NFL Draft

References

Wisconsin
Wisconsin Badgers football seasons
Wisconsin Badgers football